Cul or CUL may refer to:

 Cambridge University Library
 City University London
 Columbia University Library
 Cumberland, from its Chapman code
 Bachigualato Federal International Airport, (IATA airport code: CUL) in Culiacán, Sinaloa, Mexico
 Cul (software), a female vocal for Vocaloid 3
 Serpent (comics), a Marvel Comics character named Cul Borson

See also
 Cul de canard, down feathers of a duck
 Cul-de-sac, a short dead-end street